In astronomy, a luminosity function gives the number of stars or galaxies per luminosity interval. Luminosity functions are used to study the properties of large groups or classes of objects, such as the stars in clusters or the galaxies in the Local Group.

Note that the term "function" is slightly misleading, and the luminosity function might better be described as a luminosity distribution.  Given a luminosity as input, the luminosity function essentially returns the abundance of objects with that luminosity (specifically, number density per luminosity interval).

Main sequence luminosity function
The main sequence luminosity function maps the distribution of main sequence stars according to their luminosity.  It is used to compare star formation and death rates rates, and evolutionary models, with observations.  Main sequence luminosity functions vary depending on their host galaxy and on selection criteria for the stars, for example in the Solar neighbourhood or the Small Magellanic Cloud.

White dwarf luminosity function
The white dwarf luminosity function (WDLF) gives the number of white dwarf stars with a given luminosity.  As this is determined by the rates at which these stars form and cool, it is of interest for the information it gives about the physics of white dwarf cooling and the age and history of the Galaxy.

Schechter luminosity function
The Schechter luminosity function provides a parametric description of the space density of galaxies as a function of their luminosity. The form of the function is

The parameter  has units of number density and provides the normalization. 

Equivalently, this equation can be expressed in terms of log-quantities with

The galaxy luminosity function may have different parameters for different populations and environments; it is not a universal function.

It is often more convenient to rewrite the Schechter function in terms of magnitudes, rather than luminosities.  In this case, the Schechter function becomes:

Note that because the magnitude system is logarithmic, the power law has logarithmic slope .

Integrals of the Schechter function can be expressed via the incomplete gamma function

References

Stellar astronomy
Galaxies
Photometry
Equations of astronomy